David Robert Holt (born 29 December 1981) is an English cricketer who has also represented the France national cricket team.

Career

David Holt's cricket career began in 1999 when he began to play for the Middlesex second XI. The same year, he represented England Under-19s at the Under-19 European Championship in Belfast, though the next year, he was playing for France at the senior European Championship, qualifying for them due to his French mother. He played just one match in the tournament, against Greece.

He did not play for France again after that year, continuing to play for the Middlesex second XI alongside various other teams before making his first-class debut for Loughborough UCCE against Nottinghamshire in 2005. He played a further first-class match for the university side against Hampshire the following season.

References

1981 births
Living people
English cricketers
French cricketers
Loughborough MCCU cricketers
People from Hammersmith